Willie James Jennings (born April 29, 1961) is an American theologian, known for his contributions on liberation theologies, cultural identities, and theological anthropology. He is currently an associate professor of systematic theology and Africana studies at Yale University.

Biography 
Jenning gained his B.A. in religion and theology at Calvin College in 1984, and his M.Div in Fuller Theological Seminary in 1987. He completed his Ph.D. in religion, with a concentration on theology and ethics, at Duke University in 1993, supervised under Geoffrey Wainwright. His Ph.D. dissertation topic is “Reclaiming the Creature: Anthropological Vision in the Thought of Athanasius of Alexandria and Karl Barth.”

From 1990 to 2015, Jennings worked at Duke University Divinity School and taught theology and black church studies there, before he was appointed associate professor of systematic theology and Africana studies at Yale in 2015.  He is an ordained Baptist minister and has served as interim pastor for several North Carolina churches.

The Christian Imagination: Theology and the Origins of Race 
In 2010, Jennings published his book, for which he received the American Academy of Religion book award in 2011, and the Grawemeyer Award in Religion in 2015. Jennings released Acts: A Theological Commentary on the Bible through the Belief Bible commentary series in 2017. He is currently working on a major monograph provisionally entitled Unfolding the World: Recasting a Christian Doctrine of Creation.  He has also contributed to Religion Dispatches, a website run by University of Southern California concerning the intersection of religion, politics, and culture.

Argument and Summary

Critical Responsa 

This work been widely discussed in the field of academic theology.

Works 
 The Christian Imagination: Theology and the Origins of Race. New Haven, CT: Yale University Press, 2010. 
 Acts: A Theological Commentary on the Bible. Westminster John Knox Press, 2017. 
 After Whiteness: An Education in Belonging.   Grand Rapids, MI: Eerdman's Press, 2020.

See also

Liberation Theology
Postcolonial Theology

References

Living people
1961 births
Calvin University alumni
Fuller Theological Seminary alumni
Duke University alumni
Duke University faculty
Yale Divinity School faculty
Systematic theologians
African-American biblical scholars
African-American religious leaders
African-American theologians
Baptist ministers from the United States
21st-century African-American people
20th-century African-American people